HMY Bezan (or Bezaan) was a Royal Yacht of the Royal Navy of England. The Bezan was a Dutch pleasure yacht built in 1630 and presented to Charles II by the Dutch East India Company. The Bezan was about 15 feet long with a single mast and carried a crew of two, and was the precursor of modern leisure yachts. 

A "bezaan" is Dutch for a gaff rigged type of sail.

HMY Mary, which was also presented by the Dutch East India Company to Charles the same year, had “square rigging”.

Charles and his brother James raced their craft against each other. There was a race between the Dutch-built Bezan and the King’s yacht Jamie (named after James Scott, 1st Duke of Monmouth), which the former easily won.

References
 King Charles II (1979); Antonia Fraser.  .
 Diary entry of Samuel Pepys

 

Royal Yachts of the Kingdom of England
Former properties of the Dutch East India Company